This article shows the rosters of all participating teams at the 2018 Asian Women's Club Volleyball Championship in Ust-Kamenogorsk,  Kazakhstan.

Pool A

Supreme Chonburi
The following is the roster of the Thai club  Supreme Chonburi in the 2018 Asian Club Championship.

Head coach:  Nataphon Srisamutnak

NEC Red Rockets

The following is the roster of the Japanese club NEC Red Rockets in the 2018 Asian Club Championship.

Head coach:   Takayuki Kaneko

Jiangsu Zenith Steel
The following is the roster of the Chinese club Jiangsu Zenith Steel in the 2018 Asian Club Championship.

Head coach:  Cai Bin

Pool B

Altay
The following is the roster of the Kazakhstani club Altay in the 2018 Asian Club Championship.

Head coach:  Iurii Panchenko

CMFC
The following is the roster of the Taiwanese club CMFC in the 2018 Asian Club Championship.

Head coach:  Tsai Shu-Han

Paykan Tehran VC
The following is the roster of the Iranian club Paykan Tehran VC in the 2018 Asian Club Championship.

Head coach:  Mitra Shabanian

Pool C

VTV Bình Điền Long An
The following is the roster of the Vietnamese club VTV Bình Điền Long An in the 2018 Asian Club Championship.

Head coach:  Nguyễn Quốc Vũ

Garuda VC
The following is the roster of the Indonesia club Garuda VC in the 2018 Asian Club Championship.

Head coach:  Muhammad Ansori

Lanka Lions
The following is the roster of the Srilanga club Sri Lanka Representative in the 2018 Asian Club Championship.

Head coach:  Jayalal Sunith

References

External links

Asian Women's Club Volleyball Championship squads
2018 in Kazakhstani sport
2018 in women's volleyball